Karma to Burn is the debut studio album by Karma to Burn. It was released on February 25, 1997 on Roadrunner Records. There are several different versions and pressings—vinyl and cassette included— some of which appeared on Sony. The album was reissued on March 11, 2022 by Heavy Psych Sounds Records, highlighting its 25th anniversary.

Track listing

Personnel
William Mecum – guitar
Rich Mullins – bass, backing vocals
Jason Jarosz – lead vocals
Nathan Limbaugh – drums (all tracks except track 7)
Chuck Nicholas – drums (track 7)
Octavia Lambertis – additional vocals (track 2)

References 

1997 albums
Karma to Burn albums
Roadrunner Records albums